USS Pine Island (AV-12), a Currituck-class seaplane tender, is the only ship of the United States Navy to hold this name.  The ship was named after Pine Island Sound (off the coast of Lee County, Florida).

Pine Island was laid down on 16 November 1942 at the Los Angeles Shipbuilding and Dry Dock Company, San Pedro, California; launched on 26 February 1944, sponsored by Mrs. Knefler McGinnis; and commissioned on 26 April 1945.

World War II 
Departing California on 16 June 1945, Pine Island steamed to Okinawa.  There she tended seaplanes engaged in air-sea rescue operations during the final phases of World War II.  At the end of the war, she entered Tokyo Bay and contributed seaplane flight operations to the occupation of Japan in 1945.  Following occupation duty in Japan, she conducted seaplane flight operations in the Whangpoo River near Shanghai, China.  She left the Pacific in 1946, and steamed via the Suez Canal to Norfolk, Virginia.

Operation Highjump 
Departing Norfolk on 4 December, she crossed the Antarctic Circle on 25 December 1946.  Carrying one Sikorsky HO3S-1 helicopter, one Curtiss SOC Seagull amphibian, and tending three Martin PBM-5 Mariner flying boats; she contributed to the aerial exploration of Antarctica in Operation Highjump, and saved several downed aviators from the hostile climate. In addition a bay in Antarctica, Pine Island Bay, was named in honor of the ship. A glacier on Thurston Island was also named after the ship.  Departing the Antarctic in March, she traveled from Rio de Janeiro via the Panama Canal to San Diego, California, arriving there in April 1947.

Leaving California for the Far East in August 1947, she spent the winter at Tsingtao, China and the summer of 1948 in the Northern Pacific Ocean. Stored awaiting a major overhaul in 1949, she was decommissioned on 1 May 1950.

Korean War 
Recommissioned on 7 October 1950 at Alameda, California, in response to the Korean War, she departed for the Western Pacific in December.  She tended seaplanes that flew missions over enemy-held territory in Korea, before returning to San Diego in September 1951.  She was away from California on WestPac deployments January to September 1952, February to September 1953, January to August 1954, and February to August 1955.  Deployed to WestPac in June 1956, she visited Brunei, Borneo, in August, before returning to San Diego in December.  From April to December 1957 she operated again in WestPac.

Sailing for WestPac in May 1958, she visited Bangkok, Thailand, and was at Kaohsiung, Taiwan, during the Second Taiwan Strait Crisis.  She returned to San Diego in December, and departed for WestPac in June 1959.  During 1960 and 1961 she continued her Pacific duties.

Deployed to WestPac from January to June 1962, she embarked news media personnel from several countries in March in connection with the SEATO exercise "Tulungan."  Steaming for WestPac in March 1963, she operated out of Okinawa, received visitors at Chinhae, Korea, in June, and delivered fresh water to Hong Kong in August, before returning to San Diego in September.  In January 1964 she departed San Diego for the Galapagos Islands, where she provided assistance to scientists before returning to San Diego in February.

Vietnam War 

Deployed to WestPac in June 1964, she served at Da Nang, South Vietnam, in August.  In September 1965, she returned to WestPac, conducted seaplane operations in Cam Ranh Bay, South Vietnam, and participated in the 1966 Coral Sea anniversary festivities in Australia and New Zealand before returning to San Diego in June. It also took place in Operation Market Time.

Decommissioned in Puget Sound Naval Shipyard on 16 June 1967, Pine Island entered the Maritime Administration's National Defense Reserve Fleet, at Suisun Bay, CA, where she remained until stricken on 1 February 1971, and was later sold to Zidell Exploration of Portland, Oregon on 7 March 1972.

Awards 
Asiatic-Pacific Campaign Medal with one battle star
World War II Victory Medal
Navy Occupation Medal with "ASIA" clasp
China Service Medal
National Defense Service Medal
Korean Service Medal
Vietnam Service Medal, several periods between 10-Oct-1965 and 11-APR-1966
Antarctic Service Medal, 24-Dec-1946 to 10-Mar-1947
United Nations Korea Medal
Republic of Vietnam Meritorious Unit Citation (Gallantry Cross Medal Color with Palm) 02-Apr-1966 to 11-Apr-1966
Armed Forces Expeditionary Medal for Taiwan Straits and Vietnam

References 

  navsource.org: USS Pine Island

World War II seaplane tenders of the United States
Seaplane tenders of the United States Navy
Currituck-class seaplane tenders
Ships built in Los Angeles
1944 ships